The T-10 (also known as Object 730 or, IS-8)  was a Soviet heavy tank of the Cold War, the final development of the IS tank series. During development, it was called IS-8 and IS-9.  It was accepted into production in 1952 as the IS-10  (Iosif Stalin, Russian form of Joseph Stalin), but due to the political climate in the wake of Stalin's death in 1953, it was renamed T-10.

The biggest differences from its direct ancestor, the IS-3, were a longer hull, seven pairs of road wheels instead of six, a larger turret mounting a new gun with fume extractor, an improved diesel engine, and increased armour. General performance was similar, although the T-10 could carry more ammunition, from 28 rounds to 30 rounds.

T-10s (like the IS tanks they replaced) were deployed in independent tank regiments belonging to armies, and independent tank battalions belonging to divisions.  These independent tank units could be attached to mechanized units, to support infantry operations and perform breakthroughs.

Demise of Soviet heavy tanks 
The mobile nature of armoured warfare in World War II had demonstrated the drawbacks of the slow heavy tanks.  In the final push towards Berlin, mechanized divisions had become widely split up as heavy tanks lagged behind the more mobile T-34s.  The Soviets continued to produce heavy tanks for a few years as part of the Cold War arms race (compare the heavier U.S. M103 and British Conqueror), but the more flexible T-62 and T-64 tanks already had armour and armament comparable to the T-10's.

In the 1960s, the Soviets embraced the main battle tank (MBT) concept, by replacing heavy tanks with mobile medium tanks.  In the late 1960s, the independent tank battalions with heavy tanks were re-equipped with the higher-technology T-64s, and later, the very fast T-80, while regular tank and mechanized units fielded the more basic T-55s and T-72s.  T-10 production was stopped in 1966, and heavy tank projects were cancelled, such as the auto-loaded, 130 mm-armed Object 770.

Antitank guided missiles (ATGMs) started to be deployed widely during this period, and would become an effective replacement for the heavy tanks' long-range firepower.  The Soviets made use of them first on BMP-1 infantry fighting vehicles, and later on the T-64 and other MBTs.  Eventually, lighter and more modern reactive or composite armor was used to give the MBTs a further edge in protection without slowing them down.

Name changes
The T-10 underwent a number of designation changes during its design process starting in 1944 and ending its acceptance into  service as the T-10.

Production history 
The T-10 served with the Soviet Union but was not known to have been provided to Warsaw Pact nations, though Soviet heavy tank regiments stationed in those countries may have been equipped with them. Prior to 1962, T-10Ms were in simultaneous production by two factories (Kirov as Object 272 and Chelyabinsk as Object 734) whose parts were incompatible with those of the other; Kirov's version was standardized in 1962.

Some Western sources claim that the T-10M was exported to countries such as China, Egypt, and Syria, with Syria and Egypt using it in the Yom Kippur War to provide long-range support to the T-55 and T-62, with said sources claiming that the T-10s knocked out several M48 Pattons with none lost, indicating that the T-10 was used to some degree of combat success. However, the T-10 could have been mistaken for its near-identical counterpart, the IS-3. Heavy tanks were withdrawn from Soviet front-line service by 1967, and entirely removed from reserve service by 1996.

It is estimated that some 6,000 Soviet heavy tanks were built after the end of World War II, of which 1,439 were T-10s.

Variants 

 T-10 (1952)
 T-10A (1956): T-10 with an added single-plane gun stabilizer.
 T-10B (1957): T-10 with an added 2-plane gun stabilizer.
 T-10M (1957): Modernized version with longer M-62-T2 L/46 gun with five-baffle muzzle brake, 2-plane gun stabilizer, machine guns replaced with 14.5 mm KPVT (a better ballistic match for the new main gun), infrared night vision equipment, NBC protection. Overall length is 10.29 m.
 1963 - T-10M is equipped with OPVT deep-wading snorkel.
 1967 - T-10M is supplied with APDS and HEAT ammunition.
Object 266 (1950): Variant of the early IS-8 with a hydromechanical transmission. 1 built.
 Object 268 (1956): Proposed self-propelled gun on a T-10M hull. One prototype was produced, but never entered production.
 Object 282: A missile-tank armed with 9M14 Malyutka rockets.
 Object 821: A launch platform for the RT-20P ICBM.
 TES-3: A mobile nuclear power plant based on an elongated T-10 chassis. Prototype only.

Operators 

Former operators
  - Retired in 1996.
  - Withdrawn from service in 1995.

See also  
 AMX-50
 M103 heavy tank
 Conqueror tank

References

Sources
Miller, David, The Illustrated Directory of Tanks of the World (Zenith Imprint Press, 2000) 
Perret, Bryan, Soviet Armour Since 1945, London:Blandford Press (1987), 
(English) M. V. Pavlov; I. V. Pavlov, "Domestic Armored Vehicles of the 1945-1965 biennium", Table 4 "Production of tanks in the 1945-1965 biennium", Equipment and Armament, n.6 2008 (June 2008)
(Original Russian) М. В. Павлов; И.В. Павлов, "Отечественные бронированные машины в 1945–1965 гг", Таблица 4 "Производство танков в 1945–1965 гг", Техника и вооружение, n.6 2008 (June 2008)
Sewell, Stephen ‘Cookie’, Why Three Tanks?, Armor, vol. 108, n 4 (July–August 1998), Fort Knox, KY: US Army Armor Center
Sewell, Stephen ‘Cookie’ (2002). “Red Star – White Elephant?” in Armor (July–August 2002), pp 26–32. Fort Knox, KY: US Army Armor Center
Kinnear, James; Sewell, Stephen 'Cookie' Soviet T-10 Heavy Tank and Variants (Osprey Publishing, 2017) 
Tucker, Spencer, Tanks: An Illustrated History of Their Impact, ABC-CLIO (2004), 
Magnuski, Janusz. “Czołg Ciężki T-10” in Nowa Technika Wojskowa (August 1955).
Haskew, Michael. "Modern Tanks and Artillery (1945–Present): The World's Greatest Weapons (Amber Books, September 19, 2014)

External links 
 Last Heavy Tanks of the USSR - Heavy tanks and prototypes from IS-4 through T-10, at battlefield.ru.

Cold War tanks of the Soviet Union
Heavy tanks of the Cold War
Heavy tanks of the Soviet Union
Military vehicles introduced in the 1950s